Ronald Lawrence Victor Prophet (26 December 1937 – 2 March 2018) was a Canadian-American country musician and comedy performer.

He was born in Hawkesbury, Ontario, Canada. In his childhood, Prophet lived in Calumet, Quebec, and began performing at local venues in his youth. His successful musical career in the United States began in the mid-1960s. Prophet also performed in numerous Canadian television productions in the 1970s including Grand Old Country and The Ronnie Prophet Show.

From 1997, he was based in Branson, Missouri, United States, and was married to musician Glory-Anne Carriere.

Prophet died on 2 March 2018 at his home in Florida, following cardiac and kidney failure. He was 80.

Awards and recognition
 1978: winner, Juno Award, Country Male Vocalist of the Year
 1979: winner, Juno Award, Country Male Vocalist of the Year
 1980: nominee, Juno Award, Country Male Vocalist of the Year
 1984: winner Canadian Country Music Duo of the Year with Glory-Anne Carriere 
 1984: winner Canadian Country Music Entertainer of the Year
 1985: Ottawa Valley Country Music Hall of Fame
 1987: nominee, Juno Award, Country Male Vocalist of the Year
 1999: inductee, Canadian Country Music Hall of Fame

Singles

Singles with Glory-Anne Carriere

Guest singles

References

External links
Official website
 
 

1937 births
2018 deaths
Canadian comedy musicians
Canadian country singers
Canadian male singers
Canadian expatriate musicians in the United States
Juno Award winners
Apex Records artists
People from Hawkesbury, Ontario
Canadian Country Music Association Entertainer(s) of the Year winners
Canadian Country Music Association Fans' Choice Award winners